Donatien Alphonse François de Sade, best known as the Marquis de Sade, was a French aristocrat, revolutionary and author of philosophical and sadomasochistic novels exploring such controversial subjects as rape, bestiality and necrophilia. His works evidence a philosophical mind advocating a materialist philosophy in which Nature dictates absolute freedom, unrestrained by morality, religion or law, with the pursuit of personal pleasure as its foremost principle. Besides novels, he wrote philosophical tracts, novellas, short stories, and a number of plays (many of which are no longer extant). Publication, dissemination, and translation of his works have long been hindered by censorship: not until 1983 were his works allowed unfettered distribution in the UK, for instance.

Fiction

Justine and Juliette Series
 Justine (Les Infortunes de la vertu, novel, 1st version of Justine, 1787, pub. 1930)
 Justine, or Good Conduct Well-Chastised (Justine ou les Malheurs de la vertu, novel, 2nd version of Justine, 1788, pub. 1791)
One hundred and eleven notes on the New Justine (1791)
 The New Justine (La Nouvelle Justine, ou les Malheurs de la vertu, novel, 3rd version of Justine, pub. 1797-1801 with Juliette) - untranslated as of yet
 Juliette, or Vice Amply Rewarded (Histoire de Juliette, ou les Prospérités du vice, novel, sequel of La Nouvelle Justine, pub. 1797-1801)
 Juliette et Raunai, ou la Conspiration d’Amboise, nouvelle historique published in Les Crimes de l'amour, Nouvelles héroïques et tragiques, novellas, pub. 1800) - untranslated as of yet

Novels and Novella
 Dialogue Between a Priest and a Dying Man (Dialogue entre un prêtre et un moribond, 1782, pub. 1926)
 The 120 Days of Sodom, or the School of Licentiousness (Les 120 journées de Sodome, ou l'École du libertinage, 1785, pub. 1904)
 Dorci, ou la Bizarrerie du sort (novella, 1788, pub. 1881)
 Aline and Valcour (Aline et Valcour, ou le Roman philosophique, epistolary novel, 1788, pub. 1795; English translation pub. 2019)
 Philosophy in the Bedroom (La Philosophie dans le boudoir, novel in dialogues, pub. 1795)
 La Marquise de Gange (1807–1812, pub. 1813)
 Adélaïde de Brunswick, princesse de Saxe (1812, pub. 1964)
 Histoire secrète d’Isabelle de Bavière, reine de France (1813, pub. 1953)

Collections
 The Crimes of Love (Les Crimes de l'amour, Nouvelles héroïques et tragiques, novellas, pub. 1800)
 Introduction
 Une Idée sur les romans
 Vol. I
 Juliette et Raunai, ou la Conspiration d’Amboise, nouvelle historique
 La Double Épreuve
 Vol. II
 Miss Henriette Stralson, ou les Effets du désespoir, nouvelle anglaise
 Faxelange, ou les Torts de l'ambition
 Florville et Courval, ou le Fatalisme
 Vol. III
 Rodrigue, ou la Tour enchantée, conte allegorique
 Laurence et Antonio, nouvelle italienne
 Ernestine, nouvelle suedoise
 Vol. IV
 Dorgeville, ou le Criminel par vertu
 La Comtesse de Sancerre, ou la Rivale de sa fille, anecdote de la Cour de Bourgogne
 Eugénie de Franval. (in 2003, an English translation was published by Hesperus Classics under the title of Incest)

 Historiettes, Contes et Fabliaux (1788, pub. 1926)
 Historiettes
 Le Serpent
 La Saillie Gasconne
 L’Heureuse Feinte
 Le M… puni
 L'Évêque embourbé
 Le Revenant
 Les Harangueurs Provençaux
 Attrapez-moi toujours de même
 L'Époux complaisant
 Aventure incompréhensible
 La Fleur de châtaignier
 Contes et Fabliaux
 L’Instituteur philosophe
 La Prude, ou la Rencontre imprévue
 Émilie de Tourville, ou la Cruauté fraternelle
 Augustine de Villeblanche, ou le Stratagème de l’amour
 Soit fait ainsi qu’il est requis
 Le Président mystifié
 La Marquise de Thélème, ou les Effets du libertinage
 Le Talion
 Le Cocu de lui-même, ou le Raccommodement imprévu
 Il y a place pour deux
 L'Époux corrigé
 Le Mari prêtre
 La Châtelaine de Longeville, ou la Femme vengée
 Les Filous
 Appendice
 Les Dangers de la bienfaisance

Plays
 Oxtiern, The Misfortunes of Libertinage (1800) (Le Comte Oxtiern ou les Effets du Libertinage)
 Les Jumelles ou le /choix difficile
 Le Prevaricateur ou le Magistrat du temps passe
 Jeanne Laisne, ou le Siege de Beauvais
 L'Ecole des jaloux ou la Folle Epreuve
 Le Misanthrope par amour ou Sophie et Desfrancs
 Le Capricieux, ou l'Homme inegal
 Les Antiquaires
 Franchise et Trahison
 Fanny, ou les Effets du desespoir
 La Tour mysterieuse
 L'Union des arts ou les Ruses de l'amour
 Les Fetes de l'amitie

Destroyed / Lost Works

Miscellaneous
 Le Portefeuille d'un homme de lettres
 Les Journees de Florbelle, ou la Nature devoilee, suivies des Memoires de l'abbe de Modose et des Adventures d'Emilie de Volnange servant de preuves aux assertions
 Les Conversations du chateau de Charmelle (First Draft of Les Journees Florbelle
 Les Delassements du libertin, ou la Neuvaine de Cythere
 La Fine Mouche
 L'Heureux Echange
 Les Inconvenients de la pitie
 Les Reliques
 Le Cure de Prato
 Les Caprices, ou un peu de tout

Short Stories
 La Liste du Suisse
 La Messe trop chere
 L'Honnete Ivrogne
 N'y allez jamais sans lumiere
 La justice venitienne
 Adelaide de Miramas, ou le Fanatisme protestan

Plays
 Henriette et Saint-Clair, ou la Force du Sang
 La Fille malheureuse
 Divertissement
 L'Egarement de l'infortune
 Tancrede

Non-Fiction
The following works were written between 1764 and 1869
 Le Philosophe soi-disant

Travelogues
 Voyage d'Italie
 Voyage de Hollande

Essays
 Reflections on the Novel (Idee sur les romans, introductory text to Les Crimes de l'Amour)
 The Author of Les Crimes de l'Amour to Villeterque, Hack Writer (1803) (L'Auteur de "Les Crimes de l'Amour" a Villeterque, folliculaire)

Political pamphlets
 Addresse d'un citoyen de Paris, au roi des Français (1791)
 Section des Piques. Observations presentées à l'Assemblee administrative des hopitaux (28 octobre 1792)
 Section des Piques. Idée sur le mode de la sanction des Lois; par un citoyen de cette Section (2 novembre 1792)
 Pétition des Sections de Paris à la Convention nationale (1793)
 Section des Piques. Extraits des Registres des déliberations de l'Assemblée générale et permanente de la Section des Piques (1793)
 La Section des Piques à ses Frères et Amis de la Société de la Liberté et de l'Égalite, à Saintes, département de la Charente-Inferieure (1793)
 Section des Piques. Discours prononcé par la Section des Piques, aux manes de Marat et de Le Pelletier, par Sade, citoyen de cette section et membre de la Société populaire (1793)
 Petition de la Section des Piques, aux representants de peuple français (1793)

Letters and personal notes posthumously published
 Letters From Prison
 
 L'Aigle, Mademoiselle..., Lettres publiées pour la première fois sur les manuscrits autographes inédits avec une Préface et un Commentaire par Gilbert Lely (1949)
 Le Carillon de Vincennes. Lettres inédites publiées avec des notes par Gilbert Lely (1953)
 Cahiers personnels (1803–1804). Publiés pour la première fois sur les manuscrits autographes inédits avec une préface et des notes par Gilbert Lely (1953)
 Monsieur le 6. Lettres inédites (1778–1784) publiées et annotées par Georges Daumas. Préface de Gilbert Lely (1954)
 Cent onze Notes pour La Nouvelle Justine. Collection "La Terrain vague," no. IV (1956)

Uncertain/misattributions
 Theory of Libertinage
 Zoloé

References

Bibliographies by writer
Bibliography
Bibliographies of French writers
Philosophy bibliographies